The Hunt Cup is a greyhound racing competition held at Towcester Greyhound Stadium in England.

History
The race had its inaugural running during 1931 and was held at Reading Stadium (Oxford Road) over 400 yards, initially advertised as a major sprint event.

In 1933, an event at Blackpool Squires Gate Greyhound Stadium, also called the Hunt Cup was won by Beef Cutlet, who broke the world record for 500 yards straight in the semi finals. However, the event was unrelated to this competition. From 1951 until 1957 the event was not held, but it was brought back in 1958 over 460 yards.

In 1974, the Oxford Road site was closed, and eventually the competition switched to the new Reading Stadium on Bennet Road by permission of the Greyhound Racing Association, who allowed Allied Presentations Ltd to re-introduce the event in 1978. However, once again the race ended because of yet another closure, when the stadium was sold by the council to developers during 2008. 

After a 13-year absence, the event was brought back by promoter Kevin Boothby at Towcester Greyhound Stadium.

Past winners (since 1936)

Venues & Distances
1931–1950 (Reading Oxford Road, 400y)
1958–1971 (Reading Oxford Road, 460y)
1972–1973 (Reading Oxford Road, 500y)
1978–1978 (Reading Bennett Road, 635m)
1980–2007 (Reading Bennett Road, 660m)
2021-present (Towcester, 712m)

Sponsors
1971, 1980 (Stadium Bookmakers)
1984–1989 (Hall's Oxford Brewery)
1990–1992 (Castlemaine XXXX)
1993–1996 (Carlsberg Tetley)
2021–2022 (Stadium Bookmakers)

References

Greyhound racing competitions in the United Kingdom
Recurring sporting events established in 1932
Sport in Reading, Berkshire
Sport in Northamptonshire